Women Who Code (WWCode) is an international non-profit organization that provides services for women pursuing technology careers and a job board for companies seeking coding professionals. The company aims to provide an avenue into the technology world by evaluating and assisting women developing technical skills. 

In addition to training, professional evaluations, meetings, and scholarships, Women Who Code offers networking and mentorship. As of 2022, the organization has held more than 14,000 free events around the world and built a membership of over 290,000 people representing over 134 countries. The current Chief Executive Officer of Women Who Code is Alaina Percival.

History
Women Who Code was created in 2011.  It was founded as a 501(c)(3) not-for-profit and approved by the IRS in November 2013 and is best known for its weekly publication the CODE Review, free technical study groups, hack nights, career development and leadership development, and speaking events featuring influential technology industry experts and investors. Since inception, WWCode has produced thousands of events worldwide and garnered sponsorship from organizations like Google, Zendesk, VMware, KPCB, Capital One, Nike, Yelp, and many others. In the summer of 2016, Women Who Code went through Y Combinator.

Key initiatives
Women Who Code's initiatives include:
 Providing free technical study groups (Ruby, Javascript, iOS, Android, Python, Algorithms)
 Connecting members with influential tech experts and investors
 Offering career and leadership development
 Increasing women speakers and judges at conferences and hackathons
 Increasing diverse participation in the tech community

See also
Ladies of Code

References 

 Forbes: "Women Who Code Present 9 Tech Talks in San Francisco"
 Wall Street Journal: "Alaina Percival: 10 Reasons Why More Women Should Work in Software Engineering"
 CSM: "Silicon Valley's workforce could see demographic shift"
 Venture Beat: "Let’s talk about ‘women in tech': Silicon Valley still has a gender problem"
 SFBT: "Twitter hosts female-driven hackathon"
 computerweekly.com: "Women Who Code launches London meet ups"

External links
 The WWCode website

Organizations for women in science and technology
Women in science and technology
Y Combinator companies
Non-profit organizations based in the United States
501(c)(3) organizations